Chesham Amalgamations is the trading name of Chesham Amalgamations & Investments Limited, a pioneering mergers and acquisitions broking company based in the UK.  It was formed in 1962 by Dr Francis Singer and Nicholas Stacey, both Austro-Hungarian, at 36 Chesham Place, Belgravia, with the intention of assisting 

Stacey introduced Sir Miles Thomas, later Lord Thomas of Remenham, who had previously been Chairman of the British Overseas Airways Corporation, now British Airways, and President and Chairman of the National Savings Committee.  Thomas later became Chairman of Chesham.

The company benefitted from the formation of the Industrial Reorganisation Corporation by the 1966 British Labour government, which had the intention of promoting and helping finance regroupings in industry, and which thus encouraged a trend toward bigger business.  In 1966–1967 it successfully concluded US$50 million worth of corporate mergers.

By 1969, the company had recruited Sir Neil Shields as its third director.

External links
 Chesham Amalgamations website
 The history of Chesham Amalgamations

References

Companies based in the London Borough of Croydon
Investment companies of the United Kingdom
Financial services companies established in 1962
Mergers and acquisitions
Privately held companies of the United Kingdom
1962 establishments in England